United States gubernatorial elections were held in 1943, in four states. Kentucky, Louisiana and Mississippi hold their gubernatorial elections in odd numbered years, every 4 years, preceding the United States presidential election year. New Jersey at this time held gubernatorial elections every 3 years, which it would abandon in 1949.

Results

Notes

References

 
November 1943 events
United States home front during World War II